Jacques François Coquille named Dugommier (1 August 1738, Trois-Rivières, Guadeloupe – 18 November 1794, at the Battle of the Black Mountain) was a French general.

Biography

Early life
Jacques François Dugommier was born on 1 August 1738 in Trois-Rivières, Guadeloupe.

Early career
He entered service in 1759 in the unsuccessful defense of Guadeloupe and fought in Martinique in the Seven Years' War. He took the name Dugommier in 1785. He joined the Revolutionaries.

Commander in the Italian Army
In September 1793, he drove the troops of the Habsburg monarchy and the Kingdom of Sardinia from Nice. He defeated Joseph De Vins' Austrians at city of Gilette. While a Deputy of the French Convention, Dugommier succeeded General Jean François Carteaux as commander of the army besieging Toulon. Recognizing that the attack plan of a young artillery major named Napoleon Bonaparte was the correct one, Dugommier carried it out. In December 1793, he brought the Siege of Toulon to a successful conclusion. On that occasion, Napoleon reported that "General Dugommier fought with true republican courage."

Campaign in the Pyrenees
In January 1794, he was named head of the Army of the Eastern Pyrenees. His assignment was to retake the territory of Roussillon from the Spanish army of Antonio Ricardos Carrillo. He reorganized the army, weakened as it was by the hard combat of the preceding year spent incessantly and fruitlessly storming the Spanish positions. The Spanish became paralyzed by a leadership crisis following the successive deaths of two Commanders-in-Chief to disease, making Dugommier's task easier.

On 28 April, he was victorious at the battle of the Battle of Tech, followed by a success at the Battle of Albere on 30 April. After the decisive victory at the Battle of Boulou (or Montesquieu) on 1 May. After this defeat, Luis Firmin de Carvajal, Conde de la Union withdrew. Port-Vendres was evacuated by La Union (who had under his command 400 French noblemen of the Légion Panetier) in May. Collioure fell after a four-week siege on the 26 May. He repelled a Spanish assault on 13 August in the Battle of San-Lorenzo de la Muga. He retook the Fort de Bellegarde on 17 September 1794 (the siege had lasted since 7 May). On 22 September, an audacious attack gave him the redoubt and camp of Costouge, putting the enemy to flight and capturing most of his equipment.

He fell to Spanish shells on 18 November in the Battle of the Black Mountain, in the course of which the physician Larrey distinguished himself with 700 amputations in four days of battle. After this battle, Figueras was taken by Dominique-Catherine Pérignon, marquis de Grenade on 28 November. He was buried in Perpignan, where he rests in a pyramidal monument. Napoleon kept his souvenir, bestowing 100,000 Francs to his son for the memory of the battle of Toulon.

Legacy
His name is inscribed in the Panthéon. 
The Boulevard Dugommier in Marseille is named in his honour.
A station of the Paris Metro is named for him.

References

1738 births
1794 deaths
People from Trois-Rivières, Guadeloupe
French military personnel of the Seven Years' War
French Republican military leaders killed in the French Revolutionary Wars
French Republican military leaders of the French Revolutionary Wars
French military personnel of the French Revolutionary Wars
Military leaders of the French Revolutionary Wars
Military leaders of the French Revolutionary Wars killed in battle
Guadeloupean people of French descent
Guadeloupean soldiers
Names inscribed under the Arc de Triomphe